Va'ai Papu Vailupe (25 March 1944 – 17 January 2022), also known as Mafasolia Papu Vailupe, was a Samoan politician and accountant who served as a Cabinet Minister. He was the leader of the Tautua Samoa Party from 2010 to 2011. His father is former Prime Minister Va'ai Kolone, who co-founded the Human Rights Protection Party (HRPP).  His younger brother Asiata Sale'imoa Va'ai was leader of the Samoan Democratic United Party.

Political career
Va'ai was first elected to the Samoan Legislative Assembly at the 1991 election. In 1996 he served as Parliamentary Undersecretary for Works, EPC, and the Water Authority. After being re-elected in 1996, he was appointed to Cabinet as Minister of Justice. Between 1998 and 2001, he served as Minister of Agriculture. He lost his seat in the 2001 election.

He ran as an independent in his father's old seat of Vaisigano No.1 in the 2006 election. Shortly before the election he was shot in the neck in a politically-motivated shooting. His political rival A'eau Peniamina later denied responsibility for the shooting. Following the election he asked to join the Human Rights Protection Party, but was unsuccessful. In April 2008 he agreed with other independent MPs to form a new political party.

In December 2008 he became a founding member of the Tautua Samoa Party. As a result, in May 2009 he was one of nine Tautua MPs declared to have resigned their seats under an anti-party hopping law. He was subsequently reinstated after the Supreme Court of Samoa overturned the law and declared the formation of new parties legal.

In January 2010 new anti-party-hopping laws came into force, barring MPs from declaring their support for political parties or organizations with political aims other than the party they were elected for. In March 2010, he joined Lealailepule Rimoni Aiafi and Palusalue Fa’apo II in formally declaring his membership of the party and so was deemed to have resigned his seat. However, the ruling Human Rights Protection Party (HRPP) was unable to find a candidate for the resulting by-election, and on 2 May 2010 he was declared elected unopposed, becoming the first non-HRPP MP to win a by-election. In December 2010 he was appointed leader of the Tautua party.

Vailupe was re-elected in the 2011 election, but the result was overturned by an electoral petition, which disqualified him for bribery and treating. He was subsequently charged with thirteen counts of bribery. In May 2012 he was convicted on two counts of bribery and one of treating, and fined US$2500.

Later life and death
In the wake of the 2021 Samoan constitutional crisis Va'ai denounced the HRPP and its campaign against Samoa's judiciary.

Vaai died in New Zealand on 17 January 2022. He was buried in Vaisala, Savai'i.

Notes

References

Year of birth missing
20th-century births
2022 deaths
Members of the Legislative Assembly of Samoa
Government ministers of Samoa
Human Rights Protection Party politicians
Tautua Samoa Party politicians
Samoan politicians convicted of crimes